Treaty of Saigon may refer to:

Treaty of Saigon (1862), between France and Vietnam
Treaty of Saigon (1874), between France and Vietnam